Ted Lempert (born June 14, 1961, San Mateo, California) is a Democratic politician who served two stints in the California State Assembly from 1988 until 1992 and from 1996 until he was term limited in 2000. Lempert represented the Peninsula subregion of the San Francisco Bay Area. Lempert is currently the President of Children Now and previously served as CEO and founder of EdVoice. Both organizations advocate for changes to the California educational system. Lempert is also a trustee on the San Mateo County Board of Education representing Trustee Area .

Legislative Accomplishments 
Mr. Lempert authored landmark legislation during his eight years in the Assembly, including the Lempert-Keene Oil Spill Prevention & Response Act (1990), the Golden State Scholarshare Trust (California’s College Savings Plan) (1997), the Internet Tax Freedom Act (1998) and the Local School Construction Bond Act (2000). He had more than 70 other bills signed by Governors George Deukmejian, Pete Wilson and Gray Davis.

1988 Election 
Lempert defeated one term incumbent Assemblyman Bill Duplissea.

1992 Election 
The Peninsula lost a legislative seat following the 1990 reapportionment and incumbent congressman Tom Campbell was running for a vacant US Senate Seat. Therefore, Lempert ran in the Democratic primary to succeed Campbell, a Republican. Lempert ended up losing the primary to San Mateo County supervisor Anna Eshoo.

San Mateo County Board of Supervisors 
After Eshoo was elected to Congress, Lempert replaced her on the Board of Supervisors serving from 1993 until he resigned in 1996 having been elected to the Assembly. Lempert served as the chair of the Board in 1995.

1996 Election 
Lempert returned to the Assembly in 1996, representing the 21st district after longtime incumbent Byron Sher who represented much of the territory that had been previously Lempert's was term limited.

2004 Election 
Lempert ran for the 11th state senate district in 2004 following the term limitation of Byron Sher. Lempert lost the primary to Joe Simitian, the man who had succeeded Lempert in the Assembly.

Personal 
A lifelong resident of the San Francisco Peninsula, Mr. Lempert attended local public schools. He graduated from Princeton University’s Woodrow Wilson School of Public and International Affairs and earned his law degree from Stanford University.

He, his wife Nicole, and their three young daughters live in San Carlos, California. He currently teaches Political Science 171: California Politics at the University of California at Berkeley. Lempert serves as a member of the board of trustees of the Junior State of America.

References 
Biography of Ted Lempert
Join California Page for Ted Lempert

1961 births
Living people
People from San Carlos, California
People from San Mateo, California
Princeton University alumni
Stanford University alumni
California lawyers
School board members in California
Democratic Party members of the California State Assembly
San Mateo County Supervisors